Autumn is a Silly Symphonies animated Disney short film. It was released on February 13, 1930, by Columbia Pictures. It was the final Disney cartoon that Ub Iwerks animated.

Summary 
The short film begins by introducing us to various animals searching for food and ends by showing those animals taking shelter from the snow: The squirrels keep the nuts and corn cones in a tree, while playing with them.  Crows steal them. A hedgehog gets apples from a tree. Several beavers build a dam and dance on the banks of the river. Ducks swim in the river but leave it and fly away. Beaver, skunk, crows and the hedgehog take shelter when snow falls in the forest.

Reception
Motion Picture News (August 2, 1930): "Well done, but constructed along the same lines as most cartoons, the majority of which depend on fantastic stepping by the animal characters to put it over. The musical renditions are splendid."

Home media
The short was released on December 19, 2006, on Walt Disney Treasures: More Silly Symphonies, Volume Two.

References

External links
 

1930 films
1930 short films
1930s Disney animated short films
Silly Symphonies
Films directed by Ub Iwerks
Films produced by Walt Disney
1930 animated films
American black-and-white films
Columbia Pictures animated short films
Columbia Pictures short films
Animated films without speech
American animated short films
Animated films about animals
1930s American films